Georgiy Afanasyev  (28 February 1848, Ufa – 15 December 1925, Belgrade) was a Ukrainian historian, politician, and diplomat. Minister of Foreign Affairs of the Ukrainian State (1918). Received a master's degree for his thesis: "The main points of the ministerial Turgot" (1884); and his doctoral dissertation was: "The Conditions of the Grain Trade in France at the End of the 18th Century" (1892). From 1888 he lectured at the Odessa University.  He read in Odessa and Kiev.

Professional career and experience 
Georgiy Afanasyev graduated from the Faculty of Philology of Odessa University (1869). His main research interests are: history of ancient Egypt, the history of the Slavs and the Russian Empire, medieval and modern history of Britain and France, Russian literature and economics.

Since 1879 the cathedral Privatdozent at Odessa University universal history, while in the years 1879-1912 correspondent Odessa and Kiev a number of magazines and newspapers. In 1884 he defended his thesis and published a dedicated Turgotowi, in 1892 dissertation grain trading conditions in France in the 18th century. Some of his works have been published in France and England.

The recommendation of Sergei Witte, the then Minister of Finance of the Russian Empire in 1896, was director of the branch of the State Bank of the Russian Empire in Kiev. Branch of directed until 1918. One of his achievements was the construction of the new headquarters branch, opened in 1905 (now the headquarters of the National Bank of Ukraine). In the state controller Fedir Lyzohub government (from 3 May to 24 October 1918). After the declaration of Pavlo Skoropadsky Hetman of a federal state relationship with Russia, November 14, 1918, appointed to the post of Minister of Foreign Affairs in the Serhiy Gerbel government, a function held to fall as a result of the Ukrainian State directed against him rise and take power by the Directorate (14 December 1918).

After the fall of Hetmanatu went to Odessa, published in the newspaper Odesa lyst. Emigrated to the Kingdom of SHS, taught history at the University of Belgrade Faculty of Philology. He died in Belgrade. Part of his legacy is in the department of manuscripts of the National Library of Ukraine.

Publications 
 "The fate of Ireland", Odessa, 1887
 "Foreign Policy of Napoleon III", Odessa, 1885.

References

External links 
 Afanasyev George Yemelianovich
 The history of Ukraine's modern foreign service
 Encyclopedia of Ukraine. Edited by Volodymyr Kubijovyc. Paris—New-York, 1955
 Афанасьєв Георгій (Юрій) Омелянович: Енциклопедія історії України: Т. 1. Редкол.: В. А. Смолій (голова) та ін. НАН України. Інститут історії України. – Київ 2003, «Наукова думка». 
 Афанасьєв Юрій w: Енциклопедія українознавства,  Львів 2000,  t.1 s. 77.

1848 births
1925 deaths
Politicians from Ufa
People from Ufimsky Uyezd
Foreign ministers of Ukraine
Members of the Central Council of Ukraine
Ukrainian diplomats
19th-century Ukrainian journalists
19th-century Ukrainian historians
20th-century Ukrainian journalists
Odesa University alumni
Academic staff of Odesa University
People who emigrated to escape Bolshevism
Writers from Ufa